Pape Abdoulaye Coulibaly (born March 2, 1988, in ) is a Senegalese football player, who currently plays for Feurs US. He plays as a goalkeeper.

Career
Coulibaly started his career with Elite Foot de Dakar and joined in 2006 to AS Saint-Étienne, signing a professional contract 30 June 2011 in 2007.

International
Coulibaly is a member of the Senegal national football team, he is third keeper in movement with Cheick N'Diaye.

References

External links

Senegalese footballers
1988 births
Living people
Association football goalkeepers
Ligue 1 players
AS Saint-Étienne players